Hasan Fehmi Bey (1874 – April 6, 1909) was an Ottoman journalist, who was the editor-in-chief of Serbestî, an Ottoman newspaper owned by Mevlanzade Rifat Bey, in which he wrote articles against the newly emerging Committee of Union and Progress. He was murdered by unidentified assailants on the evening of April 6, 1909, as he was crossing the Galata Bridge in Istanbul.

Hasan Fehmi Bey was born to an ethnic Albanian family. He was buried at the tomb (türbe) of Sultan Mahmud II on Divan Yolu Caddesi in Istanbul.

1909 deaths
Assassinated journalists from the Ottoman Empire
1874 births
19th-century journalists from the Ottoman Empire
20th-century journalists from the Ottoman Empire